The Scottish Government Resilience Room (SGoRR; prior to February 2008 called the Scottish Government Emergency Room or SEER, from the former name Scottish Executive Emergency Room) is a coordination facility of the Scottish Government that is activated in cases of national emergency or crisis, or during events abroad with major implications for Scotland and the wider British Isles.

It is the Scottish equivalent of the United States' Situation Room in Washington, D.C. and the United Kingdom's Cabinet Office Briefing Rooms in Whitehall.

Operations and purpose

The main location for the operations centre in located within the Scottish Government HQ in St. Andrew's House in Edinburgh, with contingency arrangements in place to use other Scottish Government locations at Saughton House, Edinburgh and Atlantic Quay 5, Glasgow.

The operations of the Scottish Government Resilience Room is in part organised and run by Ready Scotland, an agency of the Scottish Government (Safer Scotland division).

A meeting in SEER was held on the 1 July 2007 due to the terrorist attack on Glasgow Airport. Since then, meetings have been held in the resilience room in response to significant events such as the 2009 swine flu pandemic and the Covid-19 pandemic in Scotland.

Membership
The Scottish Government Resilience Room is run by a sub-committee of the Cabinet. There is no official membership of SGoRR, however, those who regularly attend are as follows:

First Minister of Scotland
Deputy First Minister of Scotland
Cabinet Secretary for Justice and Veterans
Cabinet Secretary for Finance and the Economy
Cabinet Secretary for Health and Social Care 
Cabinet Secretary for Rural Affairs and Islands
Lord Advocate of Scotland

The meeting room has accommodation to sit up to 40 attendees, however, during the Covid-19 pandemic in Scotland, this was reduced to 17 in order to abide by Scottish Government laws and restrictions.

References

External links 
 http://www.scotland.gov.uk/Publications/2007/03/15125518/5
 http://www.ukresilience.info/upload/assets/www.ukresilience.info/err_chap_09.pdf

Emergency management in the United Kingdom
Scottish Government